"(Not Just) Knee Deep" is a funk song, with a running time of 15 minutes, 21 seconds, on Side 1 of Funkadelic's 1979 album Uncle Jam Wants You.

Song information
An edited version of the song, appearing as Side A on the single release, reached number one on the Billboard Black Singles chart. The song was written by George Clinton (credited on some releases as "George Clinton, Jr."); the recording was arranged by Walter "Junie" Morrison and produced by Clinton under the alias "Dr. Funkenstein".

The Funkadelic version is sung by Clinton and several other group members, including Philippé Wynne, who was a former lead singer of the rhythm and blues group, The Spinners, which he left two years earlier.

The song is widely regarded as a funk classic, peaking at No. 77 on the Billboard Hot 100 and topping the US R&B charts in 1979.  The lyrics tell of a "girl" who "was a freak of the week" and the man who was dancing with her. He was unimpressed by the Jerk, the Monkey, the Chicken, and the Moose, but was turned on by the Freak.

Personnel

Lead vocals: George Clinton, Garry Shider, Walter Morrison, Jessica Cleaves, Philippé Wynne
Lead guitar: Michael Hampton, Walter "Junie" Morrison
Keyboards/Synth Bass : Walter "Junie" Morrison
Drums: William "Bootsy" Collins
Percussion: Larry Fratangelo
Background vocals: Larry Heckstall, Sheila Horne, Ron Ford, Jeanette McGruder, Dawn Silva, Mike Payne, Greg Thomas, Ray Davis, Mallia Franklin, Lige Curry, James Wesley Jackson, Greg Boyer, Jerome Rogers, Linda Shider

Sampled in other music

The song has been heavily sampled by many artists. Hip hop group De La Soul sampled the intro to the song in their hit "Me Myself and I", which reached #34 on the Billboard Pop Charts and #1 on the R&B Charts.

Also LL Cool J ("Nitro"), Everlast ("Never Missin A Beat"), Tone Lōc ("Funky Cold Medina"), MC Hammer & Deion Sanders ("Straight to My Feet"), The rap group Mass 187 ("Swang Your Hips)", G-Funk Intro & his unreleased track "Do U Remember". Tha Dogg Pound used the sample in their unreleased track "Can't C Us". Geto Boys sampled the intro for "Homie Don't Play That". The Black Eyed Peas also used the beat behind it to remix their hit single "Shut Up". X Clan sampled the song in "Funkin' Lesson". It was also interpolated in the song "Get Away" by Bobby Brown. In 2014, it was sampled in Jessie J's "Seal Me with a Kiss".

EPMD sampled it in their song "Gold Digger", and Digital Underground used it in two of their songs, "Kiss You Back" and "Bran Nu Swetta".

Rapper 2Pac sampled the song for his "Intro/Bomb First (My Second Reply)" and his Dr. Dre produced track "Can't C Me".

In 1997, Vanessa Williams sampled "Knee Deep" for her song "Happiness".

Dr. Dre's song, "Fuck wit Dre Day (And Everybody's Celebratin')", is based on "Knee Deep".

South Korean girl band Mamamoo song "Um Oh Ah Yeh" from their third mini-album Pink Funky was influenced from it.

Appearances in other media
Featured in the 1979 episode of Diff'rent Strokes "The Rivals" (Season 2; Episode 10)
Frequently played by Paul Shaffer and The World's Most Dangerous Band as bumper music on episodes of Late Night with David Letterman (1982-1993).  The song was the basis of an extended sketch, aired on 20 October 1983, in which Letterman, Shaffer and Larry "Bud" Melman argued about who played the guitar solo on the original recording.  Melman proves that it was Michael "Kidd Funkadelic" Hampton—then robs Dave and Paul at gunpoint.
In the 1997 Nickelodeon movie Good Burger during the insane asylum scene, George Clinton cameos as one of the mental patients who complains about the boring music on the radio, and asks Ed, played by Kel Mitchell, to change the station. Ed finds a station playing this song, and the patients subsequently dance to it.
Featured in the 2001 movie The Wash.
Featured in the 2003 video game True Crime: Streets of LA.
Performed by George Clinton and the P-Funk All Stars on the FOX television series New York Undercover in 1995.
Performed by George Clinton and the P-Funk All Stars on "Late Night with David Letterman" on June 25, 1991.
Performed by an animated version of George Clinton (played by himself) in The Cleveland Show episode "When a Man (or a Freight Train) Loves His Cookie."
Featured in the 2015 N.W.A biopic Straight Outta Compton.

References

External links
 [ Song Review] at AllMusic

Funkadelic songs
1979 singles
Songs written by George Clinton (funk musician)
1979 songs
Songs about dancing